Smokin' Aces 2: Assassins' Ball is a 2010 action thriller film directed by P.J. Pesce and starring Tom Berenger, Vinnie Jones, Tommy Flanagan, Autumn Reeser, Keegan Connor Tracy, and Ernie Hudson. The film is a prequel to Joe Carnahan's 2006 film Smokin' Aces, centering on an FBI desk jockey who is targeted for murder by various hired assassins. It was produced by Working Title Films, and was released direct-to-video on January 19, 2010 by Universal Studios Home Entertainment.

Plot
Walter Weed is an unassuming desk jockey at the FBI who is informed by the Bureau of an assassination plot by a mysterious figure called Hal Leuco to have him killed on April 19 at exactly 3:00am. Among those who took the job include Ariella Martinez, a femme fatale who kills her victims with exotic poisons; Finbar McTeague, also known as "The Surgeon" for brutally torturing his victims; Fritz Tremor and his children Lester, Kaitlyn, and Baby Boy; and Lazlo Soot, an assassin and master of disguise. An FBI unit led by Special Agent Zane Baker secures Weed in a bunker underneath a Chicago lounge called the "Little Jazz After Hours Club" run by Special Agent Malcolm Little, with several lines of defense placed while various FBI agents pose as bar staff and patrons. The assassins enter the city separately and gather around the bar: McTeague and Martinez meeting inside as the Tremors kill the agents on the roof across from the bar in preparation to storm the bar while Kaitlyn makes her way to the bunker through the sewers. Soot kills the FBI's overwatch Agent Dumare in his hotel room and poses as him to gain access to the bunker.

Eight minutes before the deadline, McTeague and Martinez work together in an attempted hostage situation that turns into a Mexican standoff between them and the FBI agents. The standoff escalates into a shootout when the Tremors fire a bomb-strapped clown through the bar doors, Martinez killing Salerno and various agents before being fatally shot as the Tremors storm in while Little escapes the resulting bloodbath. McTeague takes the dying Martinez to a closet where he cradles her in his arms and then kills Baby Boy with a planted explosive before being gunned down by Lester and Fritz. Meanwhile, the disguised Soot escaped the firefight and tricks Abrego into letting him into the secure area, his disguise damaged while killing the agent. The Tremors breach the elevator and kill the last remaining agents outside the bunker. Soot takes an agent hostage and threatens to kill him unless Baker opens the bunker door, but Baker refuses. At the same time, the Tremors fire a rocket-propelled grenade at the door, which Soot narrowly escapes.

Kaitlyn, who has penetrated the tunnels next to the bunker, blows a hole in it and starts firing on the agents inside, trying to kill Weed. Nicholas is killed protecting him just before Baker kills Kaitlyn. With only two minutes to go, Weed suddenly tries to open the bunker door while revealing he has C4 hidden under his wheelchair and is rigged to a dead man switch. Baker is forced to shoot Redstone while attempting to talk Weed down. Weed says that he must die to kill the assassins for their heinous acts against America, believing he will be hailed as a patriotic hero after his death. Bunk realizes Weed will not back down and drags the wounded Redstone to the "spider trap", a hole in the bunker's floor used to safeguard people from the bunker collapsing. Weed detonates the C4, destroying both the bunker and the bar with Baker unable to get Redstone into the spider trap in time. Fritz is critically wounded by the explosion and begs for help from Lester, who coldly kills him for abusing him for years.

Not long after, as Lester and Soot take advantage of emergency services to escape in the crowd, Baker emerges from the ruined bar to find himself and Little the only surviving the FBI agents. Baker is approached by Special Agent Anthony Vejar who asks him if he saw Weed die, revealing that Weed was actually a CIA elite black ops specialist who used the identity of Hal Leuco to use the assassins for covert missions over the years. Weed arranged the assassination ploy to gather the assassins in one place and have them killed, with Baker realizing Weed is still alive after Vejar mentions that Hal Leuco is short for Haliaeetus leucocephalus, the bald eagle's scientific name, which was part of a playing card set Weed played with in the bunker. Baker later intercepts Weed as he gets into a car, shooting him dead before walking away.

Cast
 Tom Berenger as Walter Weed, FBI intelligence analyst; Revealed to be Hal Leuco, short for Haliaeetus leucocephalus, Latin for "bald eagle." Also known as "Socrates".
 Clayne Crawford as FBI Supervisory Special Agent Zane Baker
 David Richmond-Peck as FBI Special Agent Dominic Dumare
 Jason Schombing as FBI Special Agent Abrego
 Jared Keeso as FBI Special Agent Nicholas
 Hrothgar Mathews as FBI Special Agent Redstone
 Christopher Michael Holley as FBI Special Agent Malcolm Little
 Merwin Mondesir as FBI Agent Osterberg
 Michael Edwards as FBI Agent Williamson
 Phillip Mitchell as FBI Agent Culham
 Douglas Chapman as FBI Agent O'Keefe
 Grant Elliott as FBI Agent Patrch
 Kirsten Robek as FBI Analyst Jenny Lee
 Keegan Connor Tracy as FBI Analyst Vicky Salerno
 Sonja Bennett as FBI Analyst Jules Scott
 Ernie Hudson as FBI Special Agent Anthony Vejar
 Martha Higareda as Ariella Martinez
 Vinnie Jones as Finbar "The Surgeon" McTeague
 Autumn Reeser as Kaitlyn "AK-47" Tremor
 Maury Sterling as Lester Tremor
 Michael Parks as Fritz Tremor
 C. Ernst Harth as Baby Boy Tremor
 Tommy Flanagan as Lazlo Soot
 Peter Benson as Marty Mecklen
 Damon Johnson as Milton White

Reception

References

External links
 
 

2010 films
2010 action thriller films
American action thriller films
American crime comedy films
Canadian action thriller films
Canadian crime comedy films
Films shot in Vancouver
Direct-to-video prequel films
Universal Pictures direct-to-video films
Working Title Films films
Films with screenplays by Joe Carnahan
2010s English-language films
Films directed by P. J. Pesce
2010s Canadian films
2010s American films
American prequel films
Canadian prequel films
Films set in bunkers
English-language Canadian films